Dean Clark may refer to:

Dean Clark (ice hockey) (born 1964), ice hockey player and manager
Dean Clark (footballer) (born 1980), semi-pro footballer for Northwood F.C. and currently Slough Town F.C.
Dean Clark (rugby league) (born 1968), former New Zealand international

See also
Dean Clarke (disambiguation)